Tooele County is a county in the U.S. state of Utah. As of the 2010 United States Census, the population was 58,218. Its county seat and largest city is Tooele. The county was created in 1850 and organized the following year.

Tooele County is part of the Salt Lake City, UT Metropolitan Statistical Area. A 2008 CNNMoney.com article identified Tooele as the U.S. county experiencing the greatest job growth since 2000.

The western half is mostly covered by the Great Salt Lake Desert and includes the city of Wendover (the immediate neighbor of West Wendover, Nevada) and Ibapah. Within the central section lies Skull Valley, between the Cedar and the Stansbury Mountains. It contains a few small towns as well as the Dugway Proving Ground. The population centers are on the eastern edge in the Tooele Valley, between the Stansbury and Oquirrh Mountains. This area contains the cities of Tooele, Grantsville, Erda, and Lake Point as well as the unincorporated community of Stansbury Park. Tooele Army Depot is located on the southern edge of the valley. The Stockton Bar geologic feature separates Tooele Valley and Rush Valley, in which the towns of Stockton, Vernon, Faust, and Rush Valley are located. Additional small towns, Ophir and Mercur, are located in two canyons on the south western side of the Oquirrh Mountains.

History

Evidence of several indigenous Native American groups has been found in Tooele County, but only the western Shoshone-speaking Goshute tribe claim the desolate lands as their ancestral home. The Goshute's traditional territory includes most of modern Tooele County.

The Great Salt Lake Desert, which comprises much of the northern portion of the county, provided a major stumbling block for the ill-fated Donner-Reed Party in 1846. Its crusty sand slowed the group's wagons to such an extent that the group spent six days crossing its 80-mile length, severely sapping the group's resources and leading to their eventual disaster.

In 1847, Mormon pioneers settled in the neighboring Salt Lake Valley. Initially, Tooele Valley was used as a major grazing ground for Mormon cattle owners from Salt Lake and Utah Valleys. In 1849 the first white settlers established permanent roots in the Tooele Valley. Building a saw mill, the settlement was called E.T. City after LDS leader E.T. Benson. The territorial legislature first designated Tooele County—initially called "Tuilla"—on January 31, 1850, with significantly different boundaries. Its government was not organized at that time, and the area was attached to Salt Lake County for judicial and administrative purposes. It is speculated the name derives from a Native American chief, but controversy exists about whether such a chief lived. Alternate explanations hypothesize that the name comes from "tu-wanda", the Goshute word for "bear", or from "tule", a Spanish word of Aztec origins meaning "bulrush".

The Goshutes did not accept Mormon encroachment on their traditional homeland. The Mormons occupied the best camping sites near reliable springs, hunted in Goshute hunting grounds, and overgrazed the meadowland, leaving it unfit for sustaining the animals and plants used by the Goshutes. Mormons believed that Utah was a promised land given to them by God, and did not recognize any Goshute claim to the land. Goshutes began confiscating Mormon cattle that trespassed onto their property. In response, the Mormons ordered their armies to kill the Goshutes. In 1850, they ambushed a Goshute village, but the Goshutes were able to defend themselves without casualties. Later that year, a contingent of at least 50 men attacked the Goshute camp, killing nine and suffering no casualties. In 1851, General Daniel H. Wells took 30 people prisoners. After they tried to escape, Wells executed them.  Similar attacks occurred throughout the 1850s with Goshutes typically being on the losing side.

By June 10, 1851, the county government was organized. On that date the county attachment to Salt Lake County was terminated. By 1852, Grantsville, Batesville, and Pine Canyon (later named Lincoln) were settled. 

In 1855 the town of Richville was designated county seat, but it soon became clear that Tooele was much larger. In 1861 the territorial legislature allowed the county to select a new seat, and Tooele was selected.

In 1859 Robert B. Jarvis, a U.S. Bureau of Indian Affairs representative, convinced some of the nomadic bands to congregate at a farm reservation called Deep Creek. The results looked promising, but Jarvis' resignation in 1860 led support to disappear and the farm to be abandoned. Jarvis' replacement, Benjamin Davies, noted the Goshutes had lost faith in the federal government, and recommended limiting further encroachments on Goshute land, but his suggestions were largely ignored.

Twenty-two overland stagecoach outposts were built in Goshute territory, often on the sites of rare natural springs. Goshute attacks on mail outposts escalated in 1860, resulting in dozens of deaths in alternating waves of raids. At the outbreak of the American Civil War, federal troops left the area leaving defense in the hands of the Nauvoo Legion until General Patrick E. Connor arrived in Salt Lake City from California in 1862.

Connor acted ruthlessly toward the natives. He killed over 300 Shoshone in Southern Idaho in 1863. Connor's men attacked Native American camps, sometimes indiscriminately, but through 1863 stage coach companies had lost 16 men and over 150 horses to depredations. A peace treaty was signed in 1863 which included an annuity of goods and US$1000 in compensation of killed game in exchange for an end to the hostilities, and use of routes through the natives' territories. The treaty did not cede Goshute control of land, but a follow-up agreement made in June 1865 did.

General Connor, who was anti-Mormon, also encouraged his troops to prospect for minerals. Connor believed that mining would bring non-Mormons to Utah Territory. After his men discovered gold, silver, lead, and zinc deposits in Tooele County in 1864 he was proven right. The Rush Valley Mining District was established by soldiers in the western Oquirrh Mountains and more than 100 claims were staked in the first year. Two new mining towns, Ophir and Lewiston ballooned to over 6000 people each in the 1870s, exceeding the population of Tooele and all the Mormon settlements in the area.

Tooele County as originally defined extended into present-day Nevada. The county's borders were adjusted in 1852, in 1854, in 1856, in 1861, and in 1862. When Nevada Territory was created in 1862, the county's borders were impacted, and when the Territory became a state (1864), Tooele County was formally divested of all its Nevada area. Two more boundary adjustments were made in 1870 and 1880, after which it has retained its boundaries to the present.

Republic of Tooele
From 1874 to 1879, non-Mormon politicians from the Liberal Party of Utah gained control of Tooele County, the first time any non-Mormons had success in Utah politics. Whimsically, they called the county the Republic of Tooele.

The 1874 election marked the first success of the anti-Mormon Liberal Party, which was organized in 1870. The party viewed the large non-Mormon mining population in the county as a natural environment for electoral success and campaigned fiercely in Tooele's mining districts leading up to the June 1874 election. The non-Mormon appointed governor of Utah Territory, George L. Woods, campaigned for the Liberals in Tooele County.

The incumbent Mormon People's Party observed several Tooele polling places on election day and lodged complaints of fraud after the Liberal Party triumphed by about 300 votes out of 2,200. The People's Party alleged Liberal Party supporters had voted more than once, that many had not been residents for the required six months, and they were not taxpayers—according to territorial law, only taxpayers could vote in elections. The People's Party called attention to the 2,200 votes cast in the election although only 1,500 Tooele County property taxpayers were on record. Incumbents refused to yield control of the Tooele County recorder's office and the Tooele County Courthouse because of the alleged fraud.

Governor Woods dismissed the complaints and certified the Liberal victory. Third District Court Judge James B. McKean ruled that no evidence showing illegal activity had been presented. McKean construed poll tax as within the meaning of being a taxpayer. Since no evidence was provided there were over 300 carpetbaggers or repeat votes in the election, McKean sustained the tally and authorized deputy U.S. Marshals to install the Liberal candidates.

The recorder's office was seized when it was momentarily abandoned, but a contingent of People's Party supporters and incumbents held the county courthouse night and day. The marshals and Liberal Party candidates, outnumbered, attempted to negotiate with the armed and barricaded Mormons. Aware that a show of aggression could spark a battle, the parties were nonetheless unable to come to an agreement to hand over power.

Judge McKean issued an even more strongly worded injunction, and Brigham Young advised his followers that they had an obligation to obey the federal courts. The county courthouse was abandoned, thus beginning about five years of Liberal Party rule. However, the Utah territorial legislature, which had the last say on the qualifications of its members, refused to seat the Liberal Party representative from Tooele County.

The Liberals won an unopposed 1876 election.

In 1876, the territorial legislature passed bills requiring voter registration and requiring women's suffrage for local elections—women had been voting in territorial elections since 1870. The Liberal Party, typically supported by male miners casually interested in politics, opposed both measures. In 1878 the Liberal majority in Tooele County disappeared, and the People's Party regained control in 1879 after more than six months of Liberal procedural delays.

The Republic of Tooele era was characterized by subsequent politicians as one of excessive spending. The county was left with about $16,000 debt, significantly more than it started with.

Modern Tooele
Mining continued to play an important part in Tooele County into the 20th century, but the county benefited from two major military bases located in the western portion of the county. Wendover Air Force Base, now closed, was the training base of the Enola Gay crew, which dropped the first atomic weapon in 1945. The Tooele Army Depot, built in 1942, formerly housed the largest store of chemical and biological weapons, 45 percent of the nation's, in the United States, at the Deseret Chemical Depot. Starting August 1996, the store was reduced by destruction in a controversial weapons incinerator, at the Tooele Chemical Agent Disposal Facility; the last such weapon was destroyed in January 2012.

Since the 1980s, much of Tooele County's economic prospects have centered around private hazardous waste disposal facilities. Between 1988 and 1993, hazardous waste landfills and incinerators have been installed at Clive and Aragonite. This, coupled with uranium mine tailings from Salt Lake County which were disposed in Tooele County in the 1980s, the presence of the Deseret Chemical Depot, and a high-polluting magnesium facility in Rowley, have contributed to a general perception of Tooele County as a "sacrifice zone" for unwanted wastes.

News coverage for the county is provided by the Tooele Transcript-Bulletin newspaper.

On September 8, 2004, the Genesis spacecraft crashed into the desert floor of the Dugway Proving Ground in Tooele County.

The county's western portion is home to the Bonneville Salt Flats, traversed by Interstate 80 and the Wendover Cut-off, the former routing of the Victory Highway.

Geography
Tooele County lies on the west side of Utah. Its west border abuts the east border of the state of Nevada. Its northeast border abuts the Great Salt Lake. Three significant mountain ranges run north–south through the county. Its east boundary line is delineated by the crestline of the Oquirrh Mountains, which separate the Tooele Valley from the Salt Lake Valley. The Stansbury Mountains parallel the Oquirrhs in the eastern part of the county, and the Cedar Mountains also run parallel to the other two through the east-central part of the county. There are also isolated prominences across the county, especially at its SW corner. The county terrain is largely arid and unused for agriculture unless irrigation water is available. The county generally slopes to the north. Its highest elevation is Deseret Peak in the Stansburys, at 11,031' (3362m) ASL.

Covering vast amounts of the Great Salt Lake desert west of Salt Lake Valley, Tooele County is the second largest county in Utah and among the driest. The Skull Valley Indian Reservation lies in Skull Valley, between the Cedar and Stansbury mountain ranges.

Major highways

 Interstate 80
 Utah State Route 36
 Utah State Route 73
 Utah State Route 112
 Utah State Route 138
 Utah State Route 179
 Utah State Route 196
 Utah State Route 199

Adjacent counties

 Box Elder County - north
 Weber County - northeast (across Great Salt Lake)
 Davis County - east (across Great Salt Lake)
 Salt Lake County - east
 Utah County - east
 Juab County - south
 White Pine County, Nevada -southwest
 Elko County, Nevada - west

Protected areas

 Salt Springs Waterfowl Management Area
 Timpie Springs Waterfowl Management Area
 Uinta-Wasatch-Cache National Forest (part)
 Wasatch National Forest (part)

 Deseret Peak Wilderness Area

Lakes

 Atherley Reservoir
 Big Spring (near Callao)
 Big Spring (Skull Valley)
 Big Spring (near Timpie Springs)
 Black Spring
 Blue Lake (Salt Springs Waterfowl Management Area)
 Blue Lakes (in and near Grantsville)
 Chadman Spring
 Cold Spring
 Deep Creek Reservoir
 Dry Lake (Dugway Proving Ground)
 Dry Lake (East Tintic Mountains)
 Grantsville Reservoir
 Greasewood Pond
 Great Salt Lake (partially)
 Horseshoe Springs
 Jacobs Hole
 JB Reservoir
 Jenning Springs
 Kanaka Lake
 Last Chance Lakes
 Mill Pond
 Muskrat Spring
 North Table Mountain Reservoir
 North Willow Lake
 Oswald Reservoir
 Redden Springs
 Rock Bottom Pond
 Rocky Spring
 Rush Lake
 Salt Springs
 Scribner Spring
 Settlement Canyon Reservoir
 Simpson Springs
 South Willow Lake
 Staley Reservoir
 Stansbury Lake
 SunTen Lake I
 SunTen Lake II
 Swimming Hole
 Timpie Springs
 Valley Reservoir
 Vernon Reservoir
 Warm Spring (near Rush Valley)
 Warm Springs (near Grantsville)
 Willow Patch Springs
 Wilson Health Springs

Demographics

2000 census
As of the 2000 United States Census, there were 40,735 people, 12,677 households, and 10,128 families in the county. The population density was 5.87/sqmi (2.27/km2). There were 13,812 housing units at an average density of 1.99/sqmi (0.77/km2). The racial makeup of the county was 89.19% White, 1.28% Black or African American, 1.70% Native American, 0.60% Asian, 0.18% Pacific Islander, 4.50% from other races, and 2.55% from two or more races. Hispanic or Latino of any race were 10.34% of the population.

There were 12,677 households, out of which 47.40% had children under the age of 18 living with them, 66.00% were married couples living together, 9.50% had a female householder with no husband present, and 20.10% were non-families. 16.80% of all households were made up of individuals, and 6.10% had someone living alone who was 65 years of age or older. The average household size was 3.11 and the average family size was 3.51.

The county population contained 35.00% under the age of 18, 11.50% from 18 to 24, 29.50% from 25 to 44, 16.60% from 45 to 64, and 7.30% who were 65 years of age or older. The median age was 27 years. For every 100 females, there were 97.00 males. For every 100 females age 18 and over, there were 95.40 males.

The median income for a household in the county was $45,773, and the median income for a family was $50,438. Males had a median income of $37,861 versus $24,179 for females. The per capita income for the county was $16,321.  About 5.20% of families and 6.70% of the population were below the poverty line, including 7.70% of those under age 18 and 7.00% of those age 65 or over.

Environmental concerns
Heavy industry and the resulting pollution of the air, soil, and groundwater has affected the region in several ways. The US Environmental Protection Agency has reported that Tooele-based US Magnesium discharges dangerous toxins and cancerous byproducts. In 2008, the US Government considered listing the area as a Superfund site. Tooele County was listed in 1989 as having the worst air in Utah, according to Federal agencies and environmental groups. The Tooele County Health Department notes that the chemical output of the heavy industry can be particularly dangerous in the winter, because the region's climate and setting create winter inversions, suspending the toxins in the air, and posing "serious health concerns".

Due to the history of toxic waste disposal in the area, Tooele County and Utah residents have opposed plans to dispose of nuclear waste in the county boundaries. A high level nuclear waste site proposed to be built at the Goshute Tribe Reservation in Skull Valley faced opposition until the plan slowly fizzled out. Projects to dispose of depleted uranium at Energy Solution's Clive facility continue to cause controversy.

Politics and Government
From 1932 through 1968, Tooele County tended Democratic, selecting the Democratic nominee in every election save 1956 (but being blue enough to vote for Stevenson in 1952). From 1972 on, however, it has become powerfully Republican, voting Democratic only once in this period thus far, for Bill Clinton in 1996 (with a low plurality and by a narrow margin).

Education
All parts of Tooele County are in the Tooele School District.

Communities

Cities
 Erda
 Grantsville
 Lake Point
 Tooele (county seat)
 Wendover

Towns
 Rush Valley
 Stockton
 Vernon

Census-designated places
 Dugway
 Ophir
 Stansbury Park

Townships
 Pine Canyon (aka Lincoln)

Unincorporated communities

 Delle
 Faust
 Gold Hill
 Ibapah
 Lofgreen
 South Rim
 Terra

Ghost towns

 Ajax
 Aragonite
 Arinosa
 Barro
 Bauer
 Benmore
 Burmester
 Center
 Clifton
 Clive
 Flux
 Iosepa 
 Jacob City
 Knolls
 Low
 Mercur
 Pehrson
 Rowley
 Salduro
 Scranton
 Slagtown
 Sunshine
 Topliff
 West Dip

See also
 National Register of Historic Places listings in Tooele County, Utah

References

External links

 
 Tooele County School District
 Tooele County Chamber of Commerce

 
1851 establishments in Utah Territory
Populated places established in 1851
Salt Lake City metropolitan area
The Church of Jesus Christ of Latter-day Saints in Utah